Carretera Transistmica may be:

 Mexican Federal Highway 185
 Boyd-Roosevelt Highway